Darren "Lightnin'" Thiboutot Jr. (born September 5, 1997) is an American guitarist, known for his work with high energy rock band Memphis Lightning.  He has also shared the stage and or recorded with Eddie Kirkland, Jimmie Vaughan, Samantha Fish, Albert Castiglia, Paul Nelson, Brent Mason, Robin Trower, Buddy Guy and many more.

Early life
Thiboutot was born in Maine to his mother Deb, and father Darren "Big Red" Thiboutot. His father was a session and touring blues drummer in the 1990s for artists such as Eddie Kirkland, Tab Benoit, and The Hoo Doo Kings among many others. Lightning started playing guitar at the age of 8, learning from Teachers and Influences like Eddie Kirkland, Magic Sam, Nokie Edwards, Roy Buchanan, Chuck Berry, Roy Nichols and many more.  Lightning is also a cancer survivor and he currently records and tours with his band Memphis Lightning.

Career
Thiboutot began his professional music career and has played with his band Memphis Lightning since he was 12 years old, with his Father Big Red. His band Memphis Lightning was originally called The Blue Jets before a re-brand.  The Blue Jets featured Lightning on Guitar, his father Big Red on Drums and Slow Driver on bass.  They were also the founding members of Memphis Lightning, and served as the members for 10 years. Lightning initially only played guitar in the band, eventually leading to some vocals before becoming the frontman and primary songwriter. His playing style has been compared to Danny Gatton and Roy Buchanan meet the crazy stage antics and showmanship of Artists such as Mick Jagger and David Bowie. Since starting his career, he has shared the stage with and or recorded with other artists such as Eddie Kirkland, Buddy Guy, Luther Johnson (Guitar Junior), Jimmie Vaughan, Samantha Fish, Tab Benoit, Brent Mason, Paul Nelson, Joanna Connor, Marty Sammon, Big Sandy, Tammi Savoy, Jamiah on Fire and The Red Machine, among others. In 2016, Thiboutot represented the state of Maine in The International Blues Challenge Youth Showcase.  In 2019, Lightning began touring nationwide with his band Memphis Lightning. His Band has three Records out on SweetTone Records with two records on the way.  Also several records recorded as a session musician. In 2022, Memphis Lightning won best self produced album at The International Blues Challenge. Currently, Lightning is five years in remission from his cancer, and continues to Tour and Record. Lightning averages between 150 to 200 shows per year with his band Memphis Lightning.

Discography 
 2021 – The Road Is My Home with Memphis Lightning
 2020 – Borrowed Time with Memphis Lightning
 2019 – Live and Raw with Memphis Lightning
 2019 – Come Back Home (Live Single) with Memphis Lightning
 2019 – Long Road to Nowhere with Mean Green Mothers
 2018 – When Nature Calls with Mean Green Mothers
 2017 – Trouble with Memphis Lightning
 2017 – Waiting on an Answer with Andy Penk
 2016 – Instrumental Paradise Part 2
 2015 – Instrumental Paradise Part 1

References

External links 
 Memphis Lightning official website
 Memphis Lightning official discography
 Event/Article for Memphis Lightning Show
 News Article on Memphis Lightning for Maine News Center 207

1997 births
Living people
Guitarists from Maine
American blues guitarists
American male guitarists
21st-century American guitarists
21st-century American male musicians